Andrey Viktorovich Anufriyenko (26 November 1970 – 6 March 2019) was a Russian speed skater. He competed at the 1994 Winter Olympics and the 1998 Winter Olympics. He died on 6 March 2019.

References

External links
 

1970 births
2019 deaths
Russian male speed skaters
Olympic speed skaters of Russia
Speed skaters at the 1994 Winter Olympics
Speed skaters at the 1998 Winter Olympics
Sportspeople from Yekaterinburg